For Every Heart is the debut studio album by Ukrainian recording artist Jamala. It was released on 23 March 2011 in Ukraine through Moon Records Ukraine. The album includes the singles "You Are Made of Love", "It's Me, Jamala" and "Smile".

Singles
"You Are Made of Love" was released as the lead single from the album on 14 February 2010. "It's Me, Jamala" was released as the second single from the album on 18 October 2010. "Smile" was released as the third single from the album on 23 November 2010.

Track listing

Release history

References

External links
Official website 

Jamala albums
2011 debut albums